P. angolensis may refer to:
 Pterocarpus angolensis, a tree species also called African teak
 Pycnanthus angolensis, a tree species also called African nutmeg
 Probergrothius angolensis, a bug
 Phaeoramularia angolensis, a fungal plant pathogen

See also 
 Angolensis